
Gmina Stawiguda is a rural gmina (administrative district) in Olsztyn County, Warmian-Masurian Voivodeship, in northern Poland.

Villages
Gmina Stawiguda contains the villages and settlements of Bartąg, Bartążek, Binduga, Ćwikielnia, Dorotowo, Gągławki, Grada, Gryźliny, Jaroty, Kręsk, Majdy, Miodówko, Owczarnia, Pluski, Ruś, Rybaki, Stary Dwór, Stawiguda, Tomaszkowo, Wymój, Zazdrość, Zezuj, Zielonowo and Zofijówka.

Neighbouring gminas
Gmina Stawiguda is bordered by the city of Olsztyn and by the gminas of Gietrzwałd, Olsztynek and Purda.

References
Polish official population figures 2006

Stawiguda
Olsztyn County